Edith Alice Müller (5 February 1918 – 24 July 1995) was a Spanish-Swiss mathematician and astronomer. In 2018, the Swiss Society for Astronomy and Astrophysics (SSAA) launched the annual Edith Alice Müller Award for outstanding astronomy PhD theses in Switzerland.

Early life and education
Müller was born in Madrid, and attended the German School there before studying at ETH Zurich. She completed her PhD in mathematics in 1943 at the University of Zurich with the title "Application of Group Theory and Structural Analysis to the Moorish Adornments of the Alhambra in Granada". This was a key piece of literature in the study of Islamic design, at a time when many western historians assumed Islamic design had no base in science and was a simple craft; her research was not to absorbed into art historical literature until the 1980s.

Career
She held research positions at astronomical observatories in Zurich (1946–1951), the University of Michigan (1952–1954 and 1955–1962), and Basel (1954–1955), before becoming an assistant professor at the University of Neuchâtel in 1962. In 1972 she moved to the University of Geneva as a full professor.
She was principally involved in the study of solar physics and was the first woman to be appointed General Secretary of the International Astronomical Union, a title she held from 1976 to 1979.

Notes

Bibliography
Remembering Edith Alice Müller, eds. Immo Appenzeller et al.  (Astrophysics and Space Science Library, Volume 222), Dordrecht: Springer, 1998.
Chmielewski, Yves (1998): "Edith Alice Müller (1918–1995). Short biography", in: Remembering Edith Alice Müller, eds. Immo Appenzeller et al., Springer, 1998, pp. 6–8.
Chorbachi, W. K. (1989): "In the tower of babel: beyond symmetry in Islamic design",  Computers and Mathematics with Applications, Volume 17, Issues 4–6, 1989, pp. 751–789, .
Riedtmann, Christine: "Wege von Frauen: Mathematikerinnen in der Schweiz" [Paths of female/women mathematicians in Switzerland] (in German), European Women in Mathematics, August 31, 2010, p. 12.

20th-century Swiss mathematicians
Swiss women mathematicians
20th-century Swiss astronomers
Swiss art historians
Women astronomers
Academic staff of the University of Neuchâtel
Academic staff of the University of Geneva
1918 births
1995 deaths
20th-century women mathematicians
Women art historians
20th-century Swiss women scientists
Spanish emigrants to Switzerland